In traffic flow modeling, the intelligent driver model (IDM) is a time-continuous car-following model for the simulation of freeway and urban traffic. It was developed by Treiber, Hennecke and Helbing in 2000 to improve upon results provided with other "intelligent" driver models such as Gipps' model, which loses realistic properties in the deterministic limit.

Model definition

As a car-following model, the IDM describes the dynamics of the positions and velocities of single vehicles. For vehicle ,  denotes its position at time , and  its velocity. Furthermore,  gives the length of the vehicle. To simplify notation, we define the net distance , where  refers to the vehicle directly in front of vehicle , and the velocity difference, or approaching rate, . For a simplified version of the model, the dynamics of vehicle  are then described by the following two ordinary differential equations:

 desired velocity : the velocity the vehicle would drive at in free traffic
 minimum spacing : a minimum desired net distance. A car can't move if the distance from the car in the front is not at least 
 desired time headway : the minimum possible time to the vehicle in front
 acceleration : the maximum vehicle acceleration
 comfortable braking deceleration : a positive number
The exponent  is usually set to 4.

Model characteristics

The acceleration of vehicle  can be separated into a free road term and an interaction term:

Therefore, a single vehicle on a free road will asymptotically approach its desired velocity .

This leads to a driving behavior that compensates velocity differences while trying not to brake much harder than the comfortable braking deceleration .

Solution example

Let's assume a ring road with 50 vehicles. Then, vehicle 1 will follow vehicle 50.  Initial speeds are given and since all vehicles are considered equal, vector ODEs are further simplified to:

For this example, the following values are given for the equation's parameters, in line with the original calibrated model.

The two ordinary differential equations are solved using Runge–Kutta methods of orders 1, 3, and 5 with the same time step, to show the effects of computational accuracy in the results.

This comparison shows that the IDM does not show extremely irrealistic properties such as negative velocities or vehicles sharing the same space even for from a low order method such as with the Euler's method (RK1). However, traffic wave propagation is not as accurately represented as in the higher order methods, RK3 and RK 5. These last two methods show no significant differences, which lead to conclude that a solution for IDM reaches acceptable results from RK3 upwards and no additional computational requirements would be needed. Nonetheless, when introducing heterogeneous vehicles and both jam distance parameters, this observation could not suffice.

See also 
 Gipps' model
 Newell's car-following model
 Microscopic traffic flow model
 List of Runge–Kutta methods
 Traffic simulation

References

External links
 Interactive JS & HTML5 implementation of the intelligent driver model showing signalized intersections
 Interactive JS & HTML5 implementation showing stop & Go waves on a ring road. Links to other scenarios can be found there
 Interactive JS & HTML5 implementation showing the effect of different traffic rules at roundabouts
 Common values of the IDM parameters and hints for the simulation
 Textbook on traffic flow dynamics with a free downloadable chapter on the IDM

Road traffic management